Martina Navratilova defeated the defending champion Chris Evert Lloyd in the final, 6–1, 3–6, 6–2 to win the ladies' singles tennis title at the 1982 Wimbledon Championships. It was her third Wimbledon singles title and fifth major singles title overall.

Seeds

  Martina Navratilova (champion)
  Chris Evert Lloyd (final)
  Tracy Austin (quarterfinals)
  Andrea Jaeger (fourth round)
  Hana Mandlíková (second round)
  Wendy Turnbull (fourth round)
  Pam Shriver (fourth round)
  Mima Jaušovec (second round)
  Sylvia Hanika (fourth round)
  Barbara Potter (quarterfinals)
  Bettina Bunge (semifinals)
  Billie Jean King (semifinals)
  Anne Smith (quarterfinals)
  Andrea Leand (second round)
  Virginia Ruzici (fourth round)
  Evonne Goolagong Cawley (second round)

Evonne Goolagong Cawley was seeded 16th at the request of the Women's Tennis Association, in recognition of her having won the tournament at her last appearance, before taking maternity leave from the tour. All sixteen seeded players were granted byes in the first round, the last time byes were used in the ladies' championship.

Qualifying

Draw

Finals

Top half

Section 1

Section 2

Section 3

Section 4

Bottom half

Section 5

Section 6

Section 7

Section 8

See also
 Evert–Navratilova rivalry

References

External links

1982 Wimbledon Championships – Women's draws and results at the International Tennis Federation

Women's Singles
Wimbledon Championship by year – Women's singles
Wimbledon Championships
Wimbledon Championships